Aaron Campbell may refer to:

Aaron Campbell (born 2002), Scottish murderer guilty of the murder of Alesha MacPhail
Aaron Campbell (voice actor) (born 1991), American voice actor
Aaron Campbell, illustrator of James Bond: Felix Leiter and other comic books